Meyyem (also Romanized as Meym) is a village in Fordu Rural District, Kahak District, Qom County, Qom Province, Iran. At the 2006 census, its population was 301, in 88 families.

References 

Populated places in Qom Province